Opasnet is a web-workspace for making open assessments, which are impact assessments where anyone can freely participate and contribute. Opasnet is a wiki website and it is built on MediaWiki platform. It is currently maintained and developed by the National Institute for Health and Welfare in Finland. Opasnet has won the World Summit Award Finland competition, the eGovernment and Institutions category.

See also

 Open assessment
 Health impact assessment
 Risk assessment
 Environmental health

References

External links
 Official website

Impact assessment
Probability assessment
Risk management
MediaWiki websites
E-government by country